Short Cool Ones is a 1996 collaborative album by Wilson Diesel, (Chris Wilson and Johnny Diesel). The album consists mainly of blues covers, with one original track, "Other Man". It was co-produced by Doug Roberts, Wilson, and Diesel. They released two singles, "I Can't Stand the Rain" (March) and "Strange Love" (May).

Background
In April 1996 Wilson Diesel issued a collaborative album, Short Cool Ones on Aurora Records label for Mushroom Records, with Chris Wilson on lead vocals and harmonica, and Johnny Diesel on lead vocals and lead guitar. Australian musicologist, Ian McFarlane, described it as including "15 soul and R&B standards ... and a sole original, 'Other Man'". "Other Man" was written by Diesel (aka Mark Lizotte). Other performers were Dean Addison on bass guitar, Angus Diggs on drums, and Rob Woolf on keyboards and backing vocals.

It was recorded from late 1995 to early 1996 at Clam Shoals and Sing Sing Studios with Doug Roberts co-producing with Wilson and Diesel. Wilson Diesel recorded a separate track, "Trim the Tree", for The Spirit of Christmas 1996 (November) – a charity Christmas-based album with proceeds for Starlight Foundation's Australian branch. By that time Diesel had left Australia to work in the United States and Wilson had returned to his solo career. In November 1998, Wilson Diesel briefly reformed for the Mushroom 25 Concert – celebrating Mushroom Records' anniversary. On 26 October 2013 Wilson Diesel reunited to perform the entire album at the Sydney Blues & Roots Festival.

Track listing

Personnel
 Chris Wilson – lead vocals (on tracks 1, 5, 6, 7, 9, 13, 14, 15, 16), harmonica
 Johnny Diesel – lead vocals (on tracks 1, 2, 3, 4, 7, 8, 10, 11, 12, 13, 15), lead guitar

Additional musicians
 Dean Addison – bass guitar (except track 13)
 Angus Diggs – drums (except track 13)
 Wayne Duncan – bass guitar (track 13)
 Rob Woolf – keyboards, backing vocals
 Gary Young – drums (track 13)

Design
 Art direction, photography, design – Pierre Baroni

Production work
 Engineer – Adam Rhodes, Spiro Fousketakis
 Mastering – Don Bartley
 Mixer – Doug Roberts
 Producer – Doug Roberts, Chris Wilson, Johnny Diesel
 Studios – Clam Shoals (recording), Sing Sing Studios (recording, mixing), EMI Studios 301 (mastering)

Charts

References

General
  Note: Archived [on-line] copy has limited functionality.

Specific

1996 albums
Covers albums
Diesel (musician) albums